Biblioteca Municipal de Guayaquil (Guayaquil Municipal Library) is a public library in Guayaquil, Ecuador and is operated by the municipal government.

External links
 Biblioteca Municipal de Guayaquil

Libraries in Ecuador
Buildings and structures in Guayaquil